Markku Airio (born 25 April 1952) is a Finnish judoka. He competed in the men's heavyweight event at the 1976 Summer Olympics.

References

1952 births
Living people
Finnish male judoka
Olympic judoka of Finland
Judoka at the 1976 Summer Olympics
Sportspeople from Helsinki